The Tong Tong Fair (formerly known as Pasar Malam Besar) is the largest festival in the world for Indo (European-Indonesian) culture, held annually in the Netherlands. In 2009 it was renamed to 'Tong Tong Fair'. Established in 1959 it is one of the oldest festivals and the fourth largest grand fair in the Netherlands. It is also the annual event with the highest number of paying visitors of the Dutch city of The Hague, having consistently attracted more than 100,000 visitors since 1993.

The name ‘'Pasar Malam Besar’' is derived from the Indonesian/Malay language and literally means ‘Great Night Market’. The new name was chosen to emphasise its link with the 'Tong Tong Foundation' and its cultural mission. Another reason was to distinguish oneself from the many other fairs under the name pasar malam.

Every summer the fair is raised on its dedicated fairground, called the ‘Malieveld’, close to the central train station of The Hague. 22.000 m² of festival terrain and many, mostly Indo, volunteers will facilitate visitors from both the Netherlands and abroad. The festival hosts three popular food courts, a culinary theatre, many large to medium stages for performance art, workshop areas, areas for lecture and interviews, market areas, as well as specific fair areas for trading merchandise.

History

In defiance of government pressure to assimilate into Dutch society, a group of outspoken and independent Indos, organized in the so-called ‘Indies Cultural Circle’, assembled around famous Indo intellectual Tjalie Robinson. One of their accomplishments was the founding of the Pasar Malam Besar in 1959. Its continued success in attracting visitors of all generations and presenting a diverse and progressive programme, while preserving the centuries-old cultural ties with the Indonesian Archipelago has gone beyond their expectations. In 2003 HM Queen Beatrix herself officially opened the 45th Pasar Malam Besar. The royal opening was repeated in 2008 for its 50th edition, which was the last time the name Pasar Malam Besar was used.

Since the Indonesian National Revolution and the expulsion of all Dutch citizens from the Republic of Indonesia, the consequent fall out between the Netherlands and Indonesia has led to a long freeze of political, economical and even academic and cultural relations between the 2 nations. To a degree, this has lasted well into the 21st century. The Tong Tong Fair has always attempted to rekindle and foster those relations and since the 1970s consistently invited Indonesian artisans to the event. It was here that for instance the Royal princesses of Solo, daughters of Pakubuwono XII, performed the exclusive Serimpi dances in 1985. It was the first time in history that members of the Surakarta nobility performed these dances outside the Kraton (Royal Palace) of Solo.

In 1985 the Tong Tong Fair also organised a benefit to help rebuild the Kraton of Solo, that was damaged by a fire. In 2006 the Tong Tong Fair organised a benefit to help Indonesian victims of the 2004 Tsunami.

Programme

Music and dance

Two specific forms of Indo music usually take center stage. Kroncong which is an age old music form, with roots in Portuguese Fado music, that developed in Indo communities around Batavia (now Jakarta). Classic Kroncong orchestras can still be found in both the Netherlands and Indonesia. The other typical music form is called Indorock. It combines flamboyant showmanship and musical virtuoso, based on the American Rock and Roll idiom and has been played by Indo bands ever since the early fifties. With the participation of 3rd and 4th generation Indos, also DJ’s, Hiphoppers and urban live bands are taking their brand of Indo music to the stage at the 'Tong Tong Fair' / ‘Pasar Malam Besar’.

Food and beverage

The multi faceted Indo cuisine is considered one of the first fusion kitchens in the world and is heavily based on the kitchens of many different Indonesian areas. The classic Rijsttafel (a Dutch word meaning `Rice-table’) is a prime example of a Eurasian culinary concept that was not prevalent in pre-colonial Indonesia. The food courts present a wide range of traditional Indonesian and Asian dishes. The culinary theatre allows visitors to share and discuss recipes and make and taste dishes. The market stalls sell fresh Asian fruit such as durian or manggis and snacks such as martabak or pisang goreng. The abundance of food on offer attracts many visitors.

Merchandise and culture

A large section of the ‘Tong Tong Fair’ is reserved for amongst others Indonesian businesses selling their merchandise which includes antiques, Yogya or Bali silver, furniture, batiks, wood carvings and much more. But next to the above-mentioned eye catchers the ‘Tong Tong Fair’ also offers workshops and master classes in the arts and lecture on amongst others literature, architecture and cultural research. Notable also are the comprehensive cultural delegations from specific areas in Indonesia that are invited to participate.

Awards

The Tong Tong Fair, at that time still known as the Pasar Malam Besar, won the Promotion Award of The Hague in December 2006 in the category Tourism and Economy. This was followed in June 2007 by the prestigious Grand Prix of the National Events Awards (the ‘Oscars’ of the Dutch events industry). The Grand Prix is only awarded to events, which in terms of size, standing and allure, have become a real phenomenon. In 2008 the Tong Tong Foundation received the highest award of the city of the Hague (The Stadspenning by the municipality of The Hague).

Challenges

Notwithstanding the great number of visitors the festival attracts to this day, the greatest challenge facing it is formulating a clear vision for the future and strong strategy towards achieving its cultural mission. As the most important exhibition of Indo culture it will need to transform beyond an event of nostalgia for the Dutch East Indies towards a dynamic catalyst facilitating the evolution of Indo identity and culture. Other modern challenges concern its potential online and multi-lingual role in social media as well as their ability to professionally register the many unique cultural activities and performances hosted.

References

Notes

External links

Official website
Photographic impessions 2007
Video impressions 2008
 Jakarta Globe Article dd May 2010. Holland’s Indos Celebrate Roots by Sie Yoe Lien (Jakarta Globe, Jakarta, May 26, 2010)

Cultural festivals in the Netherlands
Music festivals in the Netherlands
Food and drink festivals in the Netherlands
Malay words and phrases
Indo people
Recurring events established in 1959
1959 establishments in the Netherlands
Indonesian words and phrases
Festivals established in 1959
Summer events in the Netherlands